Tor André Skimmeland Aasheim (born 3 March 1996) is a Norwegian footballer who plays as a winger for Stord IL. He hails from Stord, and played youth football for IL Solid and Djerv 1919. He also played for every Norway national youth team from under-15 to under-19 level.

Career
Aasheim was drafted into the senior squad of FK Haugesund in 2013, and made his first-team debut in April 2014 against Viking.

In September 2015, he signed a one-year contract with Viking FK. He got his debut for Viking in the 9th round against Tromsø IL. In July, his contract was extended until 2018. He scored his first goal for Viking against Stabæk in the 20th round of the 2016 Tippeligaen.

On 21 January 2019, Aasheim signed with Bryne FK until 2020.

Career statistics

References

External links

Profile at NFF

1996 births
Living people
People from Stord
Norwegian footballers
Norway youth international footballers
Association football forwards
FK Haugesund players
SK Djerv 1919 players
Tor André Skimmeland Aasheim
Viking FK players
FK Jerv players
Bryne FK players
Stord IL players
Eliteserien players
Norwegian expatriate footballers
Expatriate footballers in Iceland
Norwegian expatriate sportspeople in Iceland
Sportspeople from Vestland